Tiger and the Duke is the debut studio album by the experimental rock band The Sound of Animals Fighting. Four songs from this album were released in demo form on a 2004 EP of the same title.

It is a concept album revolving around the title character, Duke, and the Captain who runs the ship they are sailing. The cargo of the ship are crazy animals who howl and fight below the deck. Eventually the Captain's sons start a mutiny in which the Captain jumps off the ship.

The album was reissued via Equal Vision Records on June 26, 2007. The reissue features all tracks remixed, with new interludes, and new artwork by Drew Roulette of dredg and Dark Heavens and packaging along with eight remixes from Lover, The Lord Has Left Us.... The album peaked at 35 on the Billboard Top Heatseekers chart.

Track listing
 "Overture" – 1:29
 "Act I: Chasing Suns" – 5:13
 "Interlude" – 2:30
 "Act II: All Is Ash or the Light Shining through It" – 4:19
 "Interlude" – 2:39
 "Act III: Modulate Back to the Tonic" – 4:50
 "Interlude" – 1:53
 "Act IV: You Don't Need a Witness" – 5:21
 "Postlude" – 5:54

Re-issue track listing
 "Overture" – 3:26
 "Act 1: Chasing Suns" – 5:10
 "Interlude" – 2:22
 "Act 2: All Is Ash or the Light Shining through It" – 4:21
 "Interlude" – 3:12
 "Act 3: Modulate Back to the Tonic" – 4:50
 "Interlude" – 2:26
 "Act 4: You Don't Need a Witness" – 4:45
 Untitled – 0:04
 Untitled – 0:04
 Untitled – 0:04
 Untitled – 0:04
 "Un'aria Elettronica (Technology)" - 8:25
 "My Horse Must Lose (Portugal. The Man)" - 4:42
 "De-Ceit (Portugal. The Man)" - 3:12
 "This Heat in Dub (Technology)" - 5:01
 "Skullflower: Sorcerer's Mix (Portugal. The Man)" - 4:59
 "Horses in the Sky (Live Version)" - 5:46
 "St. Broadrick, His Mistress, and the Blacksmith (The Optimist)" - 3:59
 "The Heretic (Evol Intent)" - 4:47

Personnel

References

2005 debut albums
The Sound of Animals Fighting albums
Equal Vision Records albums
Concept albums
Rock operas